The Riverview Park & Zoo is a park and zoo located in Peterborough, Ontario, Canada. Riverview Park & Zoo began in 1933 when the venue was opened by Ross Dobbin and is now owned by the City of Peterborough (since 1968 operated and maintained by the Peterborough Utilities Group). In addition to its animal exhibits, the zoo features a miniature train ride, a F-86 Sabre fighter aircraft on display and the park contains a disc golf course. Admission and parking is free.

Animals at the zoo

 Yak
 Camel
 Reptiles
 African dwarf crocodile
 African plated lizard
 African spurred tortoise
 Ball python
 Box turtle
 Burmese python
 Boa constrictor
 Sulawesi forest turtle
 Yellow-bellied slider
 Yellow-footed tortoise
 Two-toed sloth
 North American river otter
 Capybara
 Reindeer
 Wild turkey
 Emu
 Red-necked wallaby
 Sichuan takin
 Barbary sheep
 Macaw
 Squirrel monkey
 Meerkat

Attractions
 Disc golf course
 Picnic areas
 Playground
 Ridable miniature railway
 Splash pad

References

External links

 

Zoos in Ontario
Culture of Peterborough, Ontario
Buildings and structures in Peterborough, Ontario
Tourist attractions in Peterborough County